François Joseph de Lorraine (28 August 1670 – 16 March 1675), Duke of Guise, Duke of Alençon and Duke of Angoulême, was the only son of Louis Joseph de Lorraine, Duke of Guise and Élisabeth Marguerite d'Orléans, suo jure duchess of Alençon.

Biography

Born at the Hôtel de Guise in Paris to the daughter of Gaston d'Orléans and the head of the Princely House of Guise, Francis Joseph would be their only child. He was a first cousin of the last Medici Grand Duke of Tuscany Gian Gastone de' Medici; he was also of second cousin of Louis XIV and nephew of the famous La Grande Mademoiselle. 

He was also a double descendant of Catherine de' Medici and her husband Henry II.

Upon the premature death of his father in 1671, he became Duke of Guise and Joyeuse, but was styled the Duke of Alençon, in right of his mother. 

At the death of his maternal grandmother Marguerite of Lorraine in 1672 Francis Joseph and his mother moved into the Luxembourg Palace in Paris.

The last male of the senior line of the House of Guise, he was unfortunately sickly. Still unable to walk unaided at age four, he was dropped by his nurse and died from a head injury in 1675. He died at the Luxembourg Palace. He was succeeded by his great-aunt Marie de Lorraine.

Ancestry

References

1670 births
1675 deaths
Francois Joseph
106
Guise, Francis Joseph of
Francois Joseph
Francois Joseph
Francois Joseph
17th-century French people
Royalty and nobility who died as children